The 2005 Family Circle Cup was the 33rd edition of the Family Circle Cup women's tennis tournament. This WTA Tier I Event was held at the Family Circle Tennis Center in Charleston, South Carolina, United States. Unseeded Justine Henin-Hardenne  won the singles title.

Finals

Singles

 Justine Henin-Hardenne defeated  Elena Dementieva, 7–5, 6–4

Doubles

 Conchita Martínez /  Virginia Ruano Pascual defeated  Iveta Benešová /  Květa Peschke, 6–1, 6–4

References

External links
 ITF tournament edition details

Family Circle Cup
Charleston Open
Family Circle Cup
Family Circle Cup
Family Circle Cup